Sheikh Mohamoud Sheikh Dalmar is a Somali journalist and Islamic scholar. He worked for many years with a variety of Somali media outlets as well as the BBC's Somali service. Dalmar presently serves as a radio and television producer in the UK with the private Somali Horn Cable TV network. He is a public intellectual and an authority on Muslim scripture. Additionally, Dalmar is an expert on Somali poetry and Arabic grammar, syntax and calligraphy.

See also
 Abdirahman Yabarow

References

Living people
Ethnic Somali people
Somalian journalists
Somalian scholars
Somalian emigrants to the United Kingdom
Year of birth missing (living people)